Slovak Braille is the braille alphabet for Slovak. Like braille for other languages using the Latin script, Slovak Braille assigns the 25 basic Latin letters the same as Louis Braille's original assignments for French Braille.

Slovak Braille chart
Slovak Braille is as follows:

That is, it is Czech Braille with the following additions:

References

French-ordered braille alphabets
Slovak language